Fat Sound is the seventh studio album by the ska band Bad Manners, released in 1992 on Pork Pie Records.

Track listing
All songs by Bad Manners unless noted.

 "Mambo/Ska No. 8" (Pérez Prado)
 "Do the Creep"
 "I Can't Stand the Rain" (Ann Peebles, Don Bryant, Bernard Miller)
 "Crazy Over You" (Charlie Jones)
 "Feel Like Jumping" (Marcia Griffiths)
 "Midnight Rider" (Gregg Allman)
 "Skinhead Love Affair"
 "Voices in Your Head"
 "The First Cut Is the Deepest" (Steven Georgiou)
 "Wet Dream" (Max Romeo)
 "Stop Making Love Beside Me" (B.B. Seaton)
 "Pig Bad" (Pig Bag)
 "Mambo No. 5" (Pérez Prado)
 "Teenager in Love" (Doc Pomus, Mort Shuman)
 "Lola" (Ray Davies)

Personnel

Buster Bloodvessel – Lead Vocals and Production
Louis Alphonso – Guitar, Backing Vocals
Martin Stewart – Keyboards
Chris Kane – Tenor Saxophone
Winston Bazoomies – Harmonica
David Horne – Guitar
Paul Seacroft – Guitar
Mark Pinto – Bass
Nicky Welsh – Bass
Matt Godwin – Baritone Saxophone, Backing Vocals
Ian Fullwood – Tenor Saxophone
Jan Brahms – Trombone
Rico Rodriguez – Trombone
Jon Preston – Trumpet
Alex Arudel – Trumpet
J.T. – Violin
The Billy – Harp
Longsy D – Drums, Dub Mixing, Producer
Pete Carr – Engineer, Production
Steve Oldham – Drums
Perry Melius – Drums
Spider – Backing Vocals
UHT – Backing Vocals
Recorded at F2 Studios & The Beat Farm in London and at Time Studios, NYC
Mastered at Vielklang Studio, Berlin

References

1992 albums
Bad Manners albums